Thomas Moleyns or Molyn, of Wilton, Wiltshire, was an English Member of Parliament and churchwarden.

He was a Member (MP) of the Parliament of England for Wilton in 1386. In April 1394, he was a churchwarden of St. Mary's parish, Bread Street, Wilton. Nothing is recorded of his family or background. His dates of birth and death are unknown.

References

14th-century births
Year of death missing
English MPs 1386
People from Wilton, Wiltshire